Donald Tialavea Jr. (born July 27, 1991) is a former American football tight end who is currently a tight ends coach for Utah State. He played college football at Utah State University. He signed with the Jacksonville Jaguars in 2014 as an undrafted free agent. Tialavea was formerly a tight end prior to switching positions before the 2017 NFL season.

Early years
Tialavea attended West Jordan High School in West Jordan, Utah. During his high school football career, he also played on the offensive and defensive lines. In addition to being a three-year letterwinner in football, Tialavea was also a three-year letterwinner in basketball and baseball.

College career
Tialavea appeared in 40 games for the Utah State Aggies. He ended his college career with 198 receiving yards and five touchdowns.

Professional career

Jacksonville Jaguars
Tialavea was signed by the Jacksonville Jaguars after going undrafted in the 2014 NFL Draft. He was released on May 12, 2014.

Buffalo Bills
After being released by the Jaguars, Tialavea was signed to the Buffalo Bills practice squad on September 2, 2014. He was released by the Bills on September 30, 2014.

Atlanta Falcons
Tialavea was signed to the Falcons' practice squad on November 24, 2015. After spending almost two seasons on the practice squad, he was promoted to the active roster on December 22, 2016. In his NFL debut two days later against the Carolina Panthers, Tialavea caught a touchdown for his only reception of the day.

Tialavea was inactive for the Falcons' 34-28 overtime loss to the New England Patriots in the Super Bowl.

On September 1, 2017, Tialavea was released by the Falcons.

Chicago Bears
On September 20, 2017, Tialavea was signed to the Chicago Bears' practice squad. He was released on September 26, 2017. He was re-signed on December 27, 2017.

Coaching career

Utah State
In 2020, Tialavea joined the coaching staff at his alma mater, Utah State, as a graduate assistant working with the tight ends. Head Coach Gary Andersen was fired mid-season that year. The following January, Tialavea was promoted to tight ends coach by newly hired head coach Blake Anderson.

Personal life
D.J.'s parents are Don and Tami Tialavea. He has two sisters. Tialavea graduated from Utah State with a degree in sports management in 2013, and then a master's degree in education in 2019, also from Utah State. D.J. is also an Eagle Scout.

References

External links
Utah State Aggies bio
Atlanta Falcons bio

1991 births
Living people
American sportspeople of Samoan descent
People from West Jordan, Utah
Players of American football from Utah
Coaches of American football from Utah
American football tight ends
Utah State Aggies football players
Jacksonville Jaguars players
Buffalo Bills players
Atlanta Falcons players
Chicago Bears players
Utah State Aggies football coaches